Jackson Brett Vroman (June 6, 1981 – June 29, 2015) was an American-born Lebanese professional basketball player. He was naturalized as a Lebanese citizen to play for the Lebanon national basketball team, replacing the other naturalized American Lebanese player, Joe Vogel. He is the son of former NBA player Brett Vroman, who played briefly for the Utah Jazz in the 1980–81 NBA season.

Early life and education 
His senior year in high school, he played at Viewmont High School in Bountiful, Utah for coach Emery. He later attended and played basketball at Snow College in Ephraim, Utah and Iowa State University. 

During his time at Iowa State, Vroman was a subject of an NCAA rule violation when it was revealed that his former head coach Larry Eustachy paid players, including Vroman, for making free throws during practice and games during the 2002–03 season.

Professional career 
Vroman was a second-round draft pick of the Chicago Bulls in the 2004 NBA draft. He played for the Phoenix Suns and the New Orleans Hornets/New Orleans/Oklahoma City Hornets, averaging 4.6 points and 3.8 rebounds per game.

During the 2004–05 NBA season he was part of a trade that saw him and teammates Casey Jacobsen and Maciej Lampe being sent to the Hornets for guard Jim Jackson.

In the 2006-07 season, he played for CB Gran Canaria in the Spanish ACB. He began the 2007/08 season with CB Girona before being signed by BC Lietuvos Rytas in February 2008. In October 2010 he signed with the Dongguan Leopards in China. For the 2011–12 season, he signed with the Incheon ET Land Elephants in South Korea, but in December 2011, he signed a contract with the Jiangsu Dragons.

He then signed for the Barangay Ginebra Kings in the Philippines and played his first game for them on March 4, 2012. Later that year, he joined the Shandong Lions of China.

Personal life 
His father, Brett had a 12-year basketball career and played for the Utah Jazz during the 1980–81 NBA season.

Death
Vroman was found dead in a swimming pool at his friend's home in Hollywood, California on June 29, 2015. The death was ruled accidental; security camera footage showed him falling into his pool. 

Autopsy showed an enlarged heart, with toxicology reports showing ketamine, cocaine, and GHB in his system.

Honours

Club 
 Asian Championship
 Champions: 2009, 2010 (Mahram)
 West Asian Championship
 Champions: 2010 (Mahram)
 3rd: 2009 (Saba Mehr)
 Iranian Basketball Super League
 Champions: 2009–10 (Mahram)
 3rd: 2008–09 (Saba Mehr)

Individual 
 Asian Championship
 Most Valuable Player: 2009 (Mahram)
 FIBA Asia Championship 2009 6th-top scorer averaging 17.3 ppg
 FIBA Asia Championship 2009 5th-top rebounder averaging 8.1 rpg

Notes

References

External links 
 
 Jackson Vroman NBA Profile
 Jackson Vroman Iowa State Profile
 Basketpedya.com Profile
 Vroman signs to play for Lebanon
 Jackson Vroman Online Memorial Website

1981 births
2015 deaths
2010 FIBA World Championship players
American emigrants to Lebanon
American expatriate basketball people in China
American expatriate basketball people in Iran
American expatriate basketball people in Lebanon
American expatriate basketball people in Lithuania
American expatriate basketball people in the Philippines
American expatriate basketball people in South Korea
American expatriate basketball people in Spain
American men's basketball players
Barangay Ginebra San Miguel players
Basketball players from California
BC Rytas players
Capitanes de Arecibo players
CB Girona players
CB Gran Canaria players
Centers (basketball)
Chicago Bulls draft picks
Daegu KOGAS Pegasus players
Iowa State Cyclones men's basketball players
Jiangsu Dragons players
Junior college men's basketball players in the United States
Lebanese men's basketball players
Liga ACB players
Mahram Tehran BC players
New Orleans Hornets players
Philippine Basketball Association imports
Phoenix Suns players
Power forwards (basketball)
Shandong Hi-Speed Kirin players
Shenzhen Leopards players
Snow College alumni
Sportspeople from Sacramento County, California
Snow Badgers men's basketball players
Naturalized citizens of Lebanon